MHC may refer to:

Biology
Major histocompatibility complex, a highly polymorphic region on chromosome 6 with genes particularly involved in immune functions
Myosin heavy chain, part of the motor protein myosin's quaternary protein structure

Colleges
 Mars Hill College (now Mars Hill University), a college in Mars Hill, North Carolina, USA
 Mount Holyoke College, a college in South Hadley, Massachusetts, USA
 William E. Macaulay Honors College, an honors college within the City University of New York

Health
 Managed health care
 Mental health counselor
 Metropolitan Hospital Center, East Harlem, New York City

Sports
 Malaysian Hockey Confederation
 Mediterranean Handball Confederation
 Mid Hudson Conference
 Milwaukee Hurling Club

Other
 Maimonides Heritage Center
 Massachusetts Historical Commission
 Mile high club
 Mochoʼ language (ISO 639:mhc), a moribund Mayan language spoken in Chiapas, Mexico
 Mocopulli Airport (IATA: MHC), Dalcahue, Los Lagos, Chile
 Model of hierarchical complexity
 Mohawk–Hudson convergence, a meteorological phenomenon
 Murphy-Hoffman Company
 Museum of the History of Catalonia
 Coastal Minehunters, a class of mine warfare vessels of the United States Navy